Záhorce is a village and municipality in the Veľký Krtíš District of the Banská Bystrica Region of southern Slovakia.

Záhorce lies on the right bank of the river Ipeľ in the Krtíš valley . At present, the municipality of Záhorce includes in its territorial division also two former independent villages of Selešťany and Podlužany.

Monuments 
The Evangelical church, a simple one-aisle tolerance building with a semi-circularly finished presbytery and a tower of 1781. After a fire in 1831, the church was restored, similarly in 1846. The interior is flat-ceilinged with a fabion. The altar is a simple Baroque column architecture from the 18th century. The church facades are smooth, the windows have a semi-circular finish. The tower, divided by pilasters, is finished with a bell helmet.

References

External links

http://www.statistics.sk/mosmis/eng/run.html

Villages and municipalities in Veľký Krtíš District